Złotoryjsko  is a settlement in the administrative district of Gmina Murowana Goślina, within Poznań County, Greater Poland Voivodeship, in west-central Poland. It is close to the Warta river, between Mściszewo and Promnice.

The settlement has a population of 70.

References

Villages in Poznań County